Selimus is a monotypic genus of Brazilian jumping spiders containing the single species, Selimus venustus. It was first described by George and Elizabeth Peckham in 1901, known from a single male found in Brazil. The species name is derived from Latin venustus "charming".

In 2006 Michael Saaristo erroneously erected a genus of the same name in the family Theridiidae for the species Anelosimus placens.

References

Endemic fauna of Brazil
Monotypic Salticidae genera
Salticidae
Spiders of Brazil